Edward Albert Shils (1 July 1910 – 23 January 1995) was a Distinguished Service Professor in the Committee on Social Thought and in Sociology at the University of Chicago and an influential sociologist. He was known for his research on the role of intellectuals and their relations to power and public policy. His work was honored in 1983 when he was awarded the Balzan Prize. In 1979, he was selected by the National Council on the Humanities to give the Jefferson Lecture, the highest award given by the U.S. federal government for distinguished intellectual achievement in the humanities.

Education
Shils grew up in Philadelphia, where he went to high school. Though he taught sociology and social thought, he did not have a formal degree in those fields. His undergraduate degree, from the University of Pennsylvania, was in French literature. He came to the attention of Louis Wirth, a distinguished sociologist at the University of Chicago, who hired Shils as a research assistant. Thereafter, Shils became recognized as an outstanding teacher in the field of sociology. His knowledge of the literatures of numerous cultures and fields was deemed to be impressive. He taught sociology, social philosophy, English literature, history of Chinese science and other subjects.

Career
A specialist in the thought of sociologist Max Weber, he translated works by Weber and by sociologist Karl Mannheim into English.  He served with the British Army and the United States Office of Strategic Services during World War II. Upon returning to Chicago, he was appointed Associate Professor in 1947, and Professor in 1950. In 1971, he was named Distinguished Service Professor.

For many years, Shils held joint appointments at Chicago and other universities. He was: reader in sociology at the London School of Economics from 1946 to 1950; a fellow of King's College, Cambridge, from 1961 to 1970; a fellow of Peterhouse, Cambridge, from 1970 to 1978; and an honorary professor in social anthropology at the University of London from 1971 to 1977. He was named an honorary fellow at the London School of Economics in 1972 and an honorary fellow at Peterhouse in 1979. He was also a professor at the University of Leiden from 1976 to 1977.

He attempted to bridge the research traditions of German and American sociology. At Chicago, he attracted leading European scholars to teach at the University, including Arnaldo Momigliano, Raymond Aron and the British sinologist Michael Loewe, among others. Professor Shils was a member of the American Academy of Arts and Sciences and the American Philosophical Society.

Personal life
Edward Shils married the historian Irene Coltman in England towards the end of 1951.   Edward Shils and Irene Coltman had a son. They divorced. Shils died in January 1995. He was survived by his son and daughter-in-law, Adam and Carrie Shils of Chicago; a grandson, Sam Shils; and a nephew, Edward Benjamin Shils, professor emeritus at the University of Pennsylvania  A large photo of Shils hangs in the Shils Reading Room at the University of Chicago's Social Science Research Building.

Shils had a fraught relationship with Saul Bellow, a colleague at the University of Chicago who also served on the Committee on Social Thought. Shils served as his "mentor, character model and editor" and figures prominently in many of Bellow's novels, including Mr. Sammler's Planet (Artur Sammler), Humboldt's Gift (Professor Durnwald), and Ravelstein (Rakhmiel Kogon). Artur Sammler and Professor Durnwald are both described glowingly, but in Ravelstein the Shils character is treated with "animosity [that] reaches lethal proportions" following a falling out between the two. He also had a poor relationship with Alfred Kazin, with Joseph Epstein describing how he refused to have anything written by Kazin in his home and saying "I don’t want that Jew in my house" (although Shils himself was also Jewish).

Bibliography

Own works
 
 
The Intellectual Between Tradition and Modernity: The Indian Situation (1961)
Theories of Society: Foundations of Modern Sociological Theory, Two Volumes in One, with Jesse R. Pitts, Talcott Parsons (Editor), & Kaspar D. Naegele, New York: The Free Press (1961)
The Calling of Sociology, and Other Essays on the Pursuit of Learning (1980)
Tradition  (Chicago: University of Chicago Press, 1981)
The Constitution of Society (Chicago: University of Chicago Press, 1982)
The Academic Ethic (1984).
 
 Portraits: A Gallery of Intellectuals. Edited by Joseph Epstein  (Chicago: University of Chicago Press, 1997)

Critical studies, reviews and biography

Translations

See also
 Chicago school (sociology)

Notes

References
Joseph Epstein, My Friend Edward

External links
 Shils Obituary at Chicago Chronicle, 1995
 In Memoriam by Hugh Trevor-Roper, The New Criterion
 Editor's Notes re Shils, University of Chicago Magazine, June 1997

1910 births
1995 deaths
Academics of the London School of Economics
Academics of the University of London
American expatriates in the United Kingdom
20th-century American Jews
American sociologists
Fellows of King's College, Cambridge
Fellows of Peterhouse, Cambridge
Fellows of the American Academy of Arts and Sciences
Academic staff of Leiden University
People from Springfield, Massachusetts
Quadrant (magazine) people
University of Chicago faculty